Maxim Copeliciuc (born 8 August 1988) is a Moldovan professional football player who currently plays for FC Tiraspol.

References

External links
 

1988 births
Living people
Moldovan footballers
Moldova international footballers
Association football goalkeepers
FC Tiraspol players